Zaspa-Rozstaje is one of the administrative districts of the city of Gdańsk, Poland. The quarter with mainly high buildings has been built on the runways of the former airport of Gdańsk (Lotnisko Gdańsk-Wrzeszcz). 
 Inhabitants: 15,118
 Area: 1.9 km2
 Population density 7,833/km2

See also
 Zaspa
 Zaspa-Młyniec

External links

 Map of Zaspa-Rozstaje

Gdańsk